Tautai Agikimu'a Kaitu'u is a Solomon Islander politician from Rennell Island. He was elected as a member of parliament for the constituency of Rennell Bellona in the 2014 Solomon Islands general election. He is Minister of Health and Medical Services.

Prior to running for the 2014 general election, Kaitu'u worked as a Medical Doctor in Australia.

He was re-elected as a Member of Parliament in the Solomon Islands general election, 2019.

References

External links
Dr. Kaitu'u's profile on site
Dr. Kaitu'u addresses World Health Assembly
 Western Australian Gazette

1959 births
Living people
Members of the National Parliament of the Solomon Islands
Health ministers of the Solomon Islands